Ipomopsis globularis is a species of flowering plant in the phlox family known by the common name Hoosier Pass ipomopsis. It is endemic to Colorado in the United States, where it grows in the Rocky Mountains.

This plant is a perennial herb. The leaves are mostly located around the base of the plant. A spherical inflorescence of pinkish or bluish white flowers over one centimeter in diameter is borne atop a woolly stem up to about 6 inches in height. The flowers are fragrant.

This plant is found only in and around the Mosquito Range of the Rocky Mountains, for example, in the Hoosier Pass. Its habitat is in the alpine climate of mountain ridges up to 4270 meters in elevation. It grows in calcareous soils. The plants grow in meadows and on talus slopes. The land is flat to sloping.

The worst threat to this species is probably motorized recreation in the habitat, such as off-road vehicles and snowmobiles. This activity has increased recently as the nearby population has increased. Mining may be a minor current threat, but mining activity has decreased in the area. Introduced species of plants pose a potential threat.

References

External links

golbularis
Flora of Colorado